Stand Strong Stand Proud is the second studio album by Vice Squad. It is the final album to feature the band's original lineup. It was originally released in 1982 by Zonophone, a division of EMI. Although it wasn't released by Riot City Records the band decided to use the Riot City name as it was a label they founded. It was later re-released by Dojo and Captain Oi! both with the same five bonus tracks.

Track listing 
All songs written by Dave Bateman and Rebecca Bond unless otherwise noted.
 "Stand Strong, Stand Proud" – 3:18
 "Humane" – 2:18
 "Cheap" – 1:41
 "Gutterchild" – 2:32
 "Rock N Roll Massacre" (Bond) – 2:59
 "Fistful of Dollars" (Baldwin, Bateman) – 2:04
 "Freedom Begins at Home" – 2:44
 "Out of Reach" – 1:53
 "Saviour Machine" (David Bowie) – 3:37
 "No Right to Reply" (Bateman) – 2:54
 "Deathwish" – 3:54
 "Propaganda" – 4:49

1993 Dojo/2000 Captain Oi! bonus tracks
 "Tomorrow's Soldier" (Bateman) – 1:56
 "Darkest Hour" – 1:54
 "Citizen" – 2:59
 "Scarred For Life" – 2:27
 "Faceless Men" – 2:29

Bonus track origins
 Tracks 13 and 14 originally appeared on Stand Strong EP
 Tracks 15–17 originally appeared on State of the Nation EP

Personnel
Vice Squad
 Beki Bondage – vocals
 Dave Bateman – guitar
 Mark Hambly – bass
 Shane Baldwin – drums

Release history

Vice Squad albums
1982 albums